Maranatha High School is a private, college preparatory Christian school in Pasadena, California.

This co-ed high school opened in 1965. The athletic teams are known as the Minutemen. The school colors are Red, White, and Navy Blue. The school was located in Sierra Madre, California until 2005, when the school moved to its present location at the historic Ambassador College campus in Pasadena. Maranatha celebrated their 50th year in 2015. As of 2019, John Rouse has been the head of school.

Demographics
The demographic breakdown of the 679 students enrolled for the 2013-2014 school year was:
 White – 45.3%
 Asian/Pacific Islander – 31.5%
 Hispanic – 11.6%
 Black – 11.6%

Notable alumni
 Tyler Dorsey (born 1996), Greek–American basketball player in the Israeli Basketball Premier League
 Jordan Calloway (born ca. 1990), actor
 Dylan Covey (born 1991), professional baseball pitcher for the Boston Red Sox Major league baseball
 Tim Worrell class of 1985, former MLB pitcher with the San Diego Padres

References

External links
Maranatha High School

Christian schools in California
Educational institutions established in 1965
Private high schools in Los Angeles County, California
Schools in Pasadena, California
Schools accredited by the Western Association of Schools and Colleges
1965 establishments in California